Evolution Mining is an Australian gold mining company with projects across Australia and in Ontario, Canada.

Evolution owns and operates mines at Cowal, New South Wales; Mt Carlton, Mt Rawdon, and Ernest Henry, Queensland; and Mungari, Western Australia.

Mine locations 
The Cowal gold operation is an open-pit gold operation approximately 350 km west of Sydney. Evoution's former Mt Carlton operation is approximately 150 km south of Townsville, Queensland. The Mt. Rawdon open pit gold operation is approximately 75 km south-west of Bundaberg, Queensland. The Mungari gold operation is approximately 600 km east of Perth and 20 km west of Kalgoorlie in Western Australia. The Ernest Henry copper-gold operation is operated by Glencore. It also operates the Red Lake mine, which is an underground gold mine in Northwestern Ontario, Canada.

History 
This growth has seen it become a mid-tier Australian mining company and 52 on the ASX top 200 Australian publicly listed companies.

In April 2015, Evolution completed the buy-out of La Mancha Resources Australian operations, valued at A$300 million, and thereby acquired the Frog's Leg and White Foil gold mines as well as the nearby processing plant at the Mungari. Mining at Frog's Leg is carried out in an underground operation while White Foil is an open pit operation, with the ore processed at the Mungari plant, which was constructed in 2013–14.

In May 2021 the company acquired Toronto Stock Exchange-listed Battle North Gold for CAD$343 million for its Bateman (formerly Phoenix) gold project near Red Lake, Ontario.

References

External links 

 

Gold mining companies of Australia
Companies based in Sydney
Companies listed on the Australian Securities Exchange
2011 establishments in Australia